Below is the list of foreign delegations attending the 9th Congress of the Sozialistische Einheitspartei Deutschlands (Socialist Unity Party of Germany), held in Berlin November 17–21 1986. Names of heads of delegations in brackets.

 Afghanistan - People's Democratic Party of Afghanistan (Nur Ahmed Nur, PB, CCS)
 Algeria - Front de Libération Nationale (Salah Goudjil, Member of the Permanent Secretariat of the CC)
 Angola - Movimiento Popular de Libertação de Angola - Partido do Trabalho (Juilão Mateus Paulo, PB, CCS)
 Argentina - Partido Comunista de la Argentina (Athos Fava, General Secretary)
 Austria - Kommunistische Partei Österreichs (Erwin Scharf, PB)
 Australia - Socialist Party of Australia (Jack McPhillips, President)
 Bahrain - National Liberation Front - Bahrain (Ali Naji Abdallah, Leading Committee Member)
 Bangladesh - Communist Party of Bangladesh (Aroy Roy, CCS)
 Belgium - Communist Party of Belgium (Albert De Coninck, CC)
 Belgium - Parti Socialiste (Marcel Lejoly, EC, Minister of German community affairs)
 Belgium - Socialistische Partij (Jos de Wininckx, Executive Bureau Member, Senate fraction president)
 Benin - Parti de la Révolution Populaire du Bénin (C.F. Azodogbehou, CC)
 Bolivia - Partido Comunista de Bolivia (Humberto Ramírez, PC, CCS)
 Brazil - Partido Comunista Brasileiro (Salomão Malina, EC, CCS)
 Britain - Communist Party of Great Britain (Peter Carter, PC of EC)
 Britain - Labour Party (George Robertson, Vice Spokesperson on Foreign Affairs)
 Bulgaria - Bulgarian Communist Party (Milko Balev, PB, CCS)
 Burundi - Unité pour le Progrès National (Pasteur Nzinahora, CC, Vice-president of PC)
 Cambodia - People's Revolutionary Party of Kampuchea (Men Sam Am, PB)
 Canada - Communist Party of Canada (Gordon Massie, CEC)
 Cape Verde - Partido Africano para a Independência de Cabo Verde (Olivio Pires, PB, CCS)
 Czechoslovakia - Komunistická Strana Československa (Vasil Biľak, Presidium Member, CCS)
 Chile - Movimiento de la Izquierda Revolucionaria
 Chile - Partido Comunista de Chile (Américo Zorilla, PC, Secretariat of CC Member)
 Chile - Partido Radical de Chile (Hugo Miranda)
 Chile - Partido Socialista de Chile (Clodomiro Almeyda, General Secretary)
 Colombia - Partido Comunista Colombiano (Jesús Villegas, CEC, CCS)
 Congo - Parti Congolais du Travail (Jean Ganga-Zandzou, PB, President of the National Assembly)
 Costa Rica - Partido del Pueblo Costarricense (Manuel Mora Salas, PC, CCS)
 Costa Rica - Partido Vanguardia Popular (Humberto Vargas, General Secretary)
 Cuba - Partido Comunista de Cuba (José Ramón Machado Ventura, PB, Secretariat Member)
 Cyprus - Ανορθωτικό Κόμμα Εργαζόμενου Λαού (Michael Poumpouris, PB, Secretariat Member)
 Denmark - Danmarks Kommunistiske Parti (Jörgen Jenssen, President)
 Dominican Republic - Partido Comunista Dominicano (Carlos Ascuasiati, PB)
 DPRK - Workers' Party of Korea (Li Jong-ok, PC, Vice-president of DPRK)
 Ecuador - Partido Comunista de Ecuador (Milton Jijón, EC, CCS)
 Egypt - Egyptian Communist Party
 Egypt - National Progressive Unionist Party (Khalid Mohieddin, General Secretary)
 El Salvador - Frente Farabundo Martí de Liberación Nacional (Schafik Handal, Supreme Command Member)
 Ethiopia - Workers' Party of Ethiopia (Mengistu Haile Mariam, General Secretary)
 Finland - Suomen kommunistinen puolue (Timo Laaksonen, PB, MP)
 France - Parti Communiste Français (Maxime Gremetz, PB, CCS)
 France - Parti Socialiste (Jacques Huntzinger)
 Ghana - Provisional National Defense Council (Kojo Tsikata)
 Grenada - Maurice Bishop Patriotic Movement (George Louison, EC)
 Greece - Κομμουνιστικό Κόμμα Ελλάδας (Nikos Kaloudis, PB)
 Greece - Πανελλήνιο Σοσιαλιστικό Κίνημα (Dimitris Sotirlis, Executive Bureau of CC)
 Guadeloupe - Parti Communiste Guadeloupéen (Guy Daninthe, General Secretary)
 Guatemala - Partido Guatemalteco del Trabajo (Samuel Ramírez, CC)
 Guatemala - Unidad Revolucionaria Nacional de Guatemala
 Guinea-Bissau - Partido Africano da Independência da Guiné e Cabo Verde (Carmen Pereira, PB, President of the National Assembly)
 Guyana - People's National Congress (Ranji Chandisingh, Vice-president)
 Guyana - People's Progressive Party (Clement Rohee, CEC)
 Haiti - Parti Unifié des Communistes Haïtiens (Max Bourjolly, CCS)
 Honduras - Partido Comunista de Honduras (Rigoberto Padilla Rush, General Secretary)
 Hungary - Magyar Szocialista Munkáspárt (György Aczél, PB)
 India - Communist Party of India (Rajasekhara Reddy, CEC)
 India - Communist Party of India (Marxist) (E. M. S. Namboodiripad, General Secretary)
 India - Indian National Congress (Mahendra Singh, All India Congress Committee member)
 Indonesia - Partai Komunis Indonesia
 Iraq - Arab Socialist Ba'ath Party (Samir Mohammed Abdul Wahab, Regional Command Council)
 Iraq - Iraqi Communist Party (Aziz Mohammed, First Secretary of CC)
 Iran - Tudeh Party of Iran (Ali Khavari, First Secretary of CC)
 Ireland - Communist Party of Ireland (James Stewart, General Secretary)
 Israel - Communist Party of Israel (Meir Vilner, General Secretary)
 Italy - Partito Comunista Italiano (Alberto Minucci, Secretariat Member)
 Italy - Partito Socialista Italiano (Arduino Aguelli, National Assembly member)
 Jamaica - Workers Party of Jamaica (Elean Thomas, PB)
 Japan - Japanese Communist Party (Saburo Uno, Permanent Presidium of CC)
 Japan - Socialist Party of Japan (Masahiro Yamamoto, Vice-president)
 Jordan - Communist Party of Jordan (Abdul Aziz al-Otteh, PB)
 Laos - Lao People's Revolutionary Party (Phoumi Vongvichit, PB)
 Lebanon - Lebanese Communist Party (Kerim Mroure, PB)
 Lebanon - Progressive Socialist Party (Tareq Chehab, PB)
 Luxembourg - Communist Party of Luxembourg (René Urbany, President)
 Madagascar - Avant-Garde de la Révolution Malgache (Ignace Rakoto, PB, Minister of Higher Education)
 Madagascar - Parti du Congrès de l'Indépendence de Madagascar (Richard Andriamanjato, President)
 Martinique - Parti Communiste Martiniquais (André Constant, PB, CCS)
 Malta - Partit Komunista Malti (Anthony Vassallo, General Secretary)
 Malta - Malta Labour Party (Leo Brincat, International Secretary, MP)
 Mexico - Partido Socialista Unificado Mexicano (Sabino Hernández, PC, CCS)
 Mongolia - Mongol Ardyn Khuv'sgatt Nam (Bugyn Deshid, PB)
 Morocco - Parti du Progrès et du Socialisme (Abdallah Layachi, PB)
 Mozambique - Frente de Libertação de Moçambique (Mariano de Araújo Matsinhe, PB)
 Namibia - South-West Africa People's Organisation (Hifikepunye Pohamba, PB, CCS)
 Netherlands - Communistische Partij van Nederland (Ton van Hoek, PB)
 Netherlands - Partij van de Arbeid (Paul Scheffer)
 New Zealand - Socialist Unity Party of New Zealand (George Jackson, General Secretary)
 Nicaragua - Frente Sandinista de Liberación Nacional (Henry Ruiz, National Direction, Minister of International Cooperation)
 Norway - Norges Kommunistiske Parti (Ingrid Negård, Vice-President)
 Pakistan - Communist Party of Pakistan
 Palestine - Palestinian Communist Party (Suleiman Najab, PB)
 Palestine - Palestine Liberation Organization (Yasser Arafat, President of the Executive Committee, delegation also included representatives of Fatah, DFLP and PLF)
 Panama - Partido del Pueblo de Panamá (Ruben Darío Souza, General Secretary)
 Paraguay - Partido Comunista Paraguayo (Ananías Maidana, Second Secretary of CC)
 Peru - Partido Comunista Peruano (Jorge del Prado, General Secretary)
 Peru - Partido Socialista Revolucionario (Leónidas Rodríguez, President)
 Philippines - Communist Party of the Philippines (PB, CCS)
 Poland - Polish United Workers' Party (Józef Czyrek, PB, CCS)
 Portugal - Partido Comunista Português (Joaquim Gomes, PC)
 Romania - Partidul Communist Român (Gheorge Oprea, Political Executive Committee, Vice Prime Minister)
 San Marino - Partito Comunista Sammarinese (Gastone Pasolini, National Direction, Minister of Communications and Relations with Local Administrations)
 São Tomé and Príncipe - Movimento de Libertação de São Tomé e Príncipe (Oscar Aguiár do Sacramento e Sousa, PB, Minister of Agriculture)
 Saudi Arabia - Communist Party in Saudi Arabia
 South Africa - African National Congress (Alfred Nzo, General Secretary)
 South Africa - South African Communist Party (Joe Slovo, National President)
 South Yemen - Yemeni Socialist Party (Ali Salim al-Baidh, General Secretary)
 Soviet Union - Communist Party of the Soviet Union (Mikhail Gorbachev, General Secretary)
 Spain - Partido Comunista de España (Francisco Frutos, EC, CCS)
 Spain - Partido Comunista de los Pueblos de España (Ignacio Gallego, General Secretary)
 Spain - Partido Socialista Obrero Español (Rafael Estrella, Federal Committee Member, Senator)
 Sri Lanka - Communist Party of Sri Lanka (Merenna Gawlias Mendis, PB)
 Sudan - Sudanese Communist Party
 Sweden - Arbetarpartiet Kommunisterna (Rolf Hagel, President)
 Sweden - Vänsterpartiet Kommunisterna (Bertil Måbrink, Vice-President)
 Switzerland - Partei der Arbeit der Schweiz (Hansjörg Hofer, PB)
 Switzerland - Sozialdemokratische Partei der Schweiz (Peter Vollmer, Vice-President)
 Syria - Arab Socialist Ba'ath Party (Dr. Suleiman Kaddah, Vice Regional Secretary)
 Syria - Syrian Communist Party (Khaled Hammami, PB)
 Tanzania - Chama Cha Mapinduzi (Paul Sozigwa, CC, National Executive Committee)
 Tunisia - Parti Communiste Tunisien (Abdelhamid Ben Mustapha, PB, CCS)
 Tunisia - Parti Socialiste Destorien (Slaheddine Ben M'barak, PB)
 Turkey - Türkiye Komünist Partisi (Haydar Kutlu, General Secretary)
 Uruguay - Partido Comunista del Uruguay (Alberto Altesor, EC, CCS)
 Uruguay - Partido Socialista (Ernesto de los Campos)
 United States - Communist Party USA (James West, PB)
 Venezuela - Partido Comunista de Venezuela (Alonso Ojeda, General Secretary)
 West Berlin - Sozialistische Einheitspartei Westberlins (Horst Schmitt, President)
 West Germany - Deutsche Kommunistische Partei (Herbert Mies, President)
 West Germany - Sozialdemokratische Partei Deutschlands (Dr. Wilhelm Bruns, Chief of International Department of Friedrich Ebert Stiftung)
 Vietnam - Communist Party of Vietnam (Chu Huy Mân, PB)
 Yugoslavia - Savez Komunista Jugoslavije (Jure Bilić, Presidium of CC)
 Zambia - United National Independence Party (Daniel Muchiwa Lisulo, CC)
 The Magazine "Problems of Peace and Socialism" (Gancho Ganev)

And other delegations of illegal parties participated.

The General People's Congress of Libya could not attend due to the American military intervention at home.

Abbreviations:
CC: Central Committee
CCS: Secretary of the Central Committee
CEC: Central Executive Committee
MP: Member of Parliament
PB: Politburo Member
PC: Political Commission

1986 in East Germany
Socialist Unity Party of Germany